Rudolph Sommers (October 30, 1886 in Cincinnati, Ohio – March 18, 1949 in Louisville, Kentucky) was a pitcher in Major League Baseball who played for the Chicago Cubs, Brooklyn Tip-Tops and Boston Red Sox in all or part of four seasons spanning 1912–1927.

References

Baseball players from Cincinnati
Major League Baseball pitchers
1886 births
1949 deaths
Chicago Cubs players
Brooklyn Tip-Tops players
Boston Red Sox players
Baseball players from Louisville, Kentucky
Waco Navigators players
Lawrenceburg (minor league baseball) players
Terre Haute Hottentots players
Terre Haute Stags players
Dayton Veterans players
Nashville Vols players
Chattanooga Lookouts players
Pawtucket Rovers players
New Haven White Wings players
St. Joseph Drummers players
Oklahoma City Indians players
Columbus Senators players
Louisville Colonels (minor league) players